Antonio E. Puente is an American neuropsychologist and academic. He was the president of the American Psychological Association in 2017. He has a private practice, is the founding director of a bilingual mental health clinic, and is on the psychology faculty at the University of North Carolina Wilmington (UNCW). He founded the journal Neuropsychology Review.

Biography
Born in Havana, Cuba in 1952; Puente earned an undergraduate degree at the University of Florida and a Ph.D. from the University of Georgia. He is married to Linda Puente and has three children.

Puente is a neuropsychologist and a psychology professor at UNCW. He founded and directs the Cape Fear Clinic, a bilingual mental health clinic in Wilmington, North Carolina, for underserved populations. He maintains a private practice in clinical neuropsychology, ranging from clinical to forensic assessments.

He founded and edited the journal Neuropsychology Review for ten years.  He also founded and edited the journal of Interprofessional Education & Practice and is the author of 10 books, 90 book chapters, and as 110 journal articles in Arabic, English, Italian Spanish, and Russian. He has been president of several other psychological societies including the North Carolina Psychological Association, North Carolina Psychological Foundation, Hispanic Neuropsychological Society, National Academy of Neuropsychology and the Society for Clinical Neuropsychology.

Before joining the UNCW faculty in 1981, Puente was a neuroanatomy professor at St. George's University School of Medicine in Grenada, where he taught courses in brain and behavior, neuropsychology and the history of psychology. He is a visiting professor at UCLA and the University of Granada in Spain as well as Honorary Professor of Psychology at Moscow State University.

Puente has served on several APA and related society boards and committees. He spent 15 years as a representative to the American Medical Association's committee on Current Procedural Terminology and served on the actual CPT Panel for 8 years before becoming the 125th President of the APA in 2017. Puente had four foci during his term as APA president: improving governance, membership engagement, psychology's international presence, and the APA Convention.

References

Living people
Neuropsychologists
University of Florida alumni
University of Georgia alumni
University of North Carolina at Wilmington faculty
Presidents of the American Psychological Association
1952 births